Sony regularly released firmware updates for its PlayStation Portable system, and encouraged PSP owners to upgrade the PSP system software. To increase system software upgrades, Sony encoded their games so that some of them require newer versions of the system software. This is a list of PSP games having such requirements. All system software updates are backwards-compatible; that is, all games that work on system software version 1.5 will work on version 2.0, and so on.

PSP games system software compatibility listing
Unless otherwise noted, system software requirements for multi-region games are referring to the North American release.

Version 1.5x
Ape Escape: On the Loose
Ape Escape Academy
Archer Maclean's Mercury
Armored Core: Formula Front
ATV Offroad Fury: Blazin' Trails
Bleach: Heat the Soul
Bleach: Heat the Soul 2
Bomberman: Panic Bomber
Burnout Legends
Bust-A-Move Pocket
Championship Manager
Coded Arms
Colin Mcrae Rally 2005
Con, The
Darkstalkers Chronicle: The Chaos Tower
Dead To Rights: Reckoning
Death, Jr.
Dynasty Warriors
Everybody's Golf
F1 Grand Prix
FIFA 06
Fired Up
Frantix
Frogger Helmet Chaos
Ghost in the Shell: Stand Alone Complex
Go! Sudoku
Gretzky NHL
GripShift
Hot Shots Golf: Open Tee
Kao Challengers
Lemmings
Lumines
Madden NFL 2006
Marvel Nemesis: Rise of the Imperfects
MediEvil Resurrection
Metal Gear Acid
Midway Arcade Treasures Extended Play
Namco Museum Battle Collection
NBA Street Showdown
Need for Speed: Most Wanted
Need for Speed: Underground Rivals
Pac-Man World 3
Prince of Persia: Revelations
Pursuit Force
Puzzle Bobble
Ridge Racer
Smart Bomb
Spider-Man 2
SSX On Tour
Star Soldier: Vanishing Earth
Star Wars: Battlefront II
Tiger Woods PGA Tour
TOCA Race Driver 2
Tony Hawk's Underground 2 Remix
Twisted Metal: Head-On
Virtua Tennis: World Tour
Wipeout Pure
World Series of Poker
World Tour Soccer

Version 2.0
Crash Tag Team Racing
Grand Theft Auto: Liberty City Stories (older, unpatched version)
Infected
Kingdom of Paradise
Need for Speed Most Wanted: 5-1-0
Pinball Hall of Fame: The Gottlieb Collection
SOCOM U.S. Navy SEALs: Fireteam Bravo
Star Wars: Battlefront 2
Tokobot
Ultimate Block Party
X-Men Legends II: Rise of Apocalypse

Version 2.5
EXIT
Peter Jackson's King Kong: The Official Game of the Movie
The Sims 2

Version 2.6
Astonishia Story
Boku no Natsuyasumi Portable
Bust-A-Move Deluxe
Capcom Classics Collection: Remixed
Daxter 
Every Extend Extra (Japanese version)
Field Commander
Gradius Collection
Grand Theft Auto: Liberty City Stories (newer, patched version)
James Bond 007: From Russia with Love
Key of Heaven
Me & My Katamari
Mega Man Powered Up
Metal Gear Ac!d 2
Metal Gear Solid: Digital Graphic Novel
Midnight Club 3: Dub Edition
Monster Hunter Freedom
MTX Mototrax
Portable Island: Te no Hira no Resort
Puzzle Challenge: Crosswords and More
Street Fighter Alpha 3
Super Monkey Ball Adventure
Syphon Filter: Dark Mirror
Tom Clancy's Splinter Cell: Essentials
Untold Legends: The Warrior's Code
Valkyrie Profile: Lenneth
Tekken 5: Dark Resurrection (Japanese And American Version)

Version 2.71
50 Cent: Bulletproof - G Unit Edition
Activision Hits Remixed (EU 2.81)
Avatar: The Last Airbender
Every Extend Extra
FIFA 07
Gangs of London
Gunpey
LocoRoco
Lumines II
Medal of Honor: Heroes
Mercury Meltdown
NASCAR
Tama-Run

Version 2.80
Killzone: Liberation
Marvel Ultimate Alliance
Mind Quiz

Version 2.81
ATV Offroad Fury Pro
Ace Combat X: Skies of Deception
Brothers in Arms: D-Day
Grand Theft Auto: Vice City Stories
Metal Gear Solid: Portable Ops
Mortal Kombat: Unchained
MotoGP
Power Stone Collection
Ridge Racer 2
Star Trek: Tactical Assault
SOCOM U.S. Navy SEALs: Fireteam Bravo 2
Sonic Rivals
Thrillville
Tony Hawk's Project 8
Yu-Gi-Oh! Duel Monsters GX: Tag Force

Version 2.82
300: March to Glory
After Burner: Black Falcon
Chotto Shot Edit (Japanese PSP Camera software)
Sid Meier's Pirates!
Puzzle Quest: Challenge of the Warlords
Test Drive: Unlimited
Tom Clancy's Rainbow Six: Vegas

Version 3.03
7 Wonders of the Ancient World

Version 3.11
Crush
Cube
PQ2
Transformers - The Game
Ultimate Board Game Collection

Version 3.40
Go!Edit 
Final Fantasy Tactics: The War of the Lions
Ratchet & Clank: Size Matters 
Hot Brain

Version 3.50
Alien Syndrome
Tomb Raider: Anniversary
Xyanide Resurrection

Version 3.51
Anata wo Yurusanai
Kaitou Apricot Portable
Medal of Honor Heroes 2
Metal Gear Solid Portable Ops Plus
Star Wars Battlefront: Renegade Squadron
The Simpsons Game

Version 3.52
Castlevania: The Dracula X Chronicles
Smackdown Vs Raw 2008
Warhammer 40,000: Squad Command
Syphon Filter: Logan's Shadow
Silverfall

Version 3.71
Patapon
Wipeout Pulse
Need for Speed: ProStreet
God of War: Chains of Olympus
Crisis Core: Final Fantasy VII
Assassin's Creed: Bloodlines
FIFA 09
Need for Speed: Carbon
Hot Wheels Ultimate Racing

Version 3.72
Luxor: Pharaoh's Challenge
Minna no Golf Portable 2

Version 4.05
PlayStation Network Collection - The Power Pack
WWE SmackDown vs. Raw 2009

Version 5.02
Gripshift 
Final Fantasy VII International (PS1 version via PSN Japan) 
Final Fantasy Dissidia – needs patch
Buzz!:Master Quiz

Version 5.03
Disney Up 
Petz My Puppy Family 
Dynasty Warriors: Strikeforce; originally released in Japan as Shin Sangokumusou Multi Raid (真・三國無双 MULTI RAID, Shin Sangokumusō Maruchi Reido)

Version 5.50
IL-2 Sturmovik: Birds of Prey - (EUR) needs patch 
Madden NFL 10 
Soul Calibur: Broken Destiny - (EUR) needs patch 
Fifa 10

Version 5.55
Tales Of Vs.
G.I. Joe: The Rise of Cobra 
Armored Core 3 Portable
Soul Calibur: Broken Destiny 
Final Fantasy: Dissidia
Disgaea 2: Dark Hero Days
Cloudy with a Chance of Meatballs
Colin McRae: Dirt 2
MotorStorm: Arctic Edge
Marvel Ultimate Alliance 2
IL-2 Sturmovik: Birds of Prey 
Metal Gear Solid: Peace Walker (5.51) 
Beaterator
Naruto Shippuden: Legends: Akatsuki Rising - (EUR)
Shin Megami Tensei Persona
Gran Turismo 
FIFA 10 
James Cameron's Avatar: The Game 
WWE Smackdown vs Raw 2010

Version 6.00 (10 Sept 2009)
Jak and Daxter: The Lost Frontier
LittleBigPlanet
Pro Evolution Soccer 2010
Gran Turismo
Assassin's Creed Bloodlines

Version 6.10 (1 Oct 2009)
Tekken 6
NBA LIVE 10
Manhunt 2
Street Fighter Alpha 3 Max
Harvest Moon: Boy & Girl
Kenka Bancho: Badass Rumble
LocoRoco Midnight Carnival
NBA 2K10
Mega Man Maverick Hunter X

Version 6.20 (18 Nov 2009)
Silent Hill: Origins
God Eater
Naruto Ultimate Ninja Heroes 3
Harvest Moon: Hero of Leaf Valley
Prince of Persia: The Forgotten Sands
Hexyz Force
Dante's Inferno
ModNation Racers
Pinball Heroes Bundle 2
Metal Gear Solid: Peace Walker
Metal Slug XX
Disgaea Infinite
TNA Impact!: Cross the Line
Midway Arcade Treasures Extended Play
Hatsune Miku: Project DIVA 2nd
Hot Shots Tennis: Get a Grip
Bejeweled 2 PSP
Shin Megami Tensei: Persona 3 Portable
Despicable Me
Groovin' Blocks PSP
Lego Harry Potter: Years 1-4
Gravity Crash Portable
Piyotama PSP
Kingdom Hearts: Birth By Sleep

Version 6.31 (29 July 2010)
Warriors Of The Lost Empire
Madden NFL 11
YS Seven
Zuma PSP
Valkyria Chronicles 2
Ace Combat Joint Assault
Hannspree Ten Kate Honda SBK Superbike World Championship
Phantasy Star Portable 2
UFC Undisputed 2010
Cabela's North American Adventures
Gladiator Begins
CLADUN: This Is An RPG!
101-in-1 Megamix
Rapala Pro Bass Fishing
Ben 10 Ultimate Alien: Cosmic Destruction
NBA 2K11
FIFA 11
DJ Max Portable 3
Blazing Souls Accelate
Bakugan: Defenders of the Core
Z.H.P. Unlosing Ranger VS Darkdeath Evilman
WWE SmackDown vs. Raw 2011
God of War: Ghost of Sparta
Ys: The Oath in Felghana
No Heroes Allowed!
Knights in the Nightmare
Split Second
Pro Evolution Soccer 2011 (Winning Eleven 2011)
Tom Clancy's Ghost Recon Predator
Peggle PSP
Worms: Battle Islands
Bomberman

Version 6.35 (24 Nov 2010)
Tron: Evolution PSP
Football Manager Handheld 2011
Monster Jam: Path of Destruction
Military History Commander: Europe at War
Michael Jackson The Experience
The Lord of the Rings: Aragorn's Quest
Legends of War: Patton's Campaign
Auditorium
Hot Shots Shorties (Blue, Red, Green, Yellow)

Version 6.37 (20 Jan 2011)
Lord of Arcana
YS: I & II Chronicles
Patapon 3
The 3rd Birthday
Final Fantasy IV

Version 6.39 (24 May 2011)
Hatsune Miku: Project DIVA Extend

See also
PlayStation Portable system software
List of PlayStation Portable games
List of PlayStation Portable Gamesharing games

Portable
Technology-related lists